Constance Ada Shotter, Lady Taylor (5 October 1911 – 1989) was a British actress who appeared in several films in the 1930s.

Shotter was born in London. By 1926 she was a chorus dancer, appearing in The Midnight Follies a Dinner, Dancing and Review by A. P. Herbert, choreographed by Penelope Spencer. Like her sister she moved from the chorus line and appeared in a series of British films in the 1930s.

Shotter married firstly Adney Gibbons, son of Walter Gibbons, in 1928. They had a son. She married secondly Charles Stuart Taylor, Member of Parliament for Eastbourne on 20 May 1936. They had four children.

Selected filmography
For the Love of Mike (1932)
Meet My Sister (1933)
To Brighton with Gladys (1933)
Brides to Be (1934)
Borrowed Clothes (1934)
Royal Cavalcade (1935)
Off the Dole (1935)

References

External links
NYPL Digital Gallery
National Portrait Gallery

1911 births
1989 deaths
English film actresses
20th-century English actresses